OpenSesame Inc. is a Portland based educational technology company that provides an online marketplace for buying and selling SCORM e-learning courses focused primarily on employee training. Its online training platform, directly connects content providers with employees and businesses for online training resources and specially designed courses for professionals, which can be accessed through a Learning management system. The company was founded in 2011 and is headquartered in Portland, Oregon. As of January 2016, OpenSesame tracks around 20,000 courses from more than 300 vendors.

History
The idea to start OpenSesame came to the founders Don Spear, Joshua Blank, Aaron Bridges and Tom Turnbull in 2011. They founded the company on the idea to aggregate fragmented elearning content from reputable publishers and resources including FranklinCovey, Cegos and Wiley through a Learning Management System (LMS). They worked on creating an ecommerce platform where any seller can add courses for sale and any buyer can purchase courses for use in their company's learning and development program. They went through the Portland State University Business Accelerator and after conducting a few pilot trials, OpenSesame received seed funding of $2 million from Harmony Investments in October 2011. The company soon gained some major clients including satellite TV giant Dish Network, SilkRoad Technology, Five Guys Burgers and Fries. In January 2014 the company raised another round of Series A funding of $10 million led by Partech Ventures to create a corporate content delivery platform modeled after iTunes. The marketplace allows the seller to set the price of the content, with a share in the profits for distributing through OpenSesame's marketplace. On July 22, 2014, OpenSesame was granted US Patent Number US 8784113 B2 for their “Open and Interactive e-Learning System and Method.”

Development
Since 2011, the OpenSesame development team has been focusing on the content and the development of features in line with the businesses' needs. The main concern of the company is not to build up a large number of new features on its marketplace, but to concentrate upon a few elaborated tools that can integrate with the various LMS’.

Use
OpenSesame is used in continuing professional development for employees and professionals via courses obtained online. Its platform allows companies to buy courses created by industry experts instead of having to create their own. It allows businesses to search for courses offered by its sellers, they can preview the content, read reviews and know about the content seller.

Accessibility
OpenSesame is the first marketplace to comply completely with the accessibility specifications of Sharable Content Object Reference Model. The content is also designed for adaptability to any of several teaching and learning scenarios with a variety of authoring tools compatible to any learning management system and custom business tools.

References

External links 
 

Educational technology companies of the United States
2011 establishments in Oregon
Companies based in Portland, Oregon
Technology companies established in 2011